The NFL International Series is a series of American football games during the National Football League (NFL) regular season that are played outside the United States. Since 2022, the series has three sub-series: the NFL London Games in the United Kingdom, which has been in place since 2007, the NFL Mexico Game in Mexico, which began in 2016 with a predecessor game in 2005, and the Germany Games which are held in multiple cities across Germany.

Initially, all games in the International Series were held in London. Wembley Stadium was the exclusive home stadium for International Series games from 2007 to 2015 and continued to host NFL games through 2019 and from 2022 to 2024; beginning in 2016, the series expanded to more stadiums, first to Twickenham Stadium in London (2016–17) and to Estadio Azteca in Mexico City (2016–17, 2019, 2022) and eventually to Tottenham Hotspur Stadium in London (2019, 2021–28) and two locations in Germany: Allianz Arena in Munich (2022 and 2024/2025) and Deutsche Bank Park in Frankfurt (2023 and 2024/2025).

Background
Before 2005, the National Football League's primary method of promoting its game abroad was through the American Bowl, a series of preseason games played around the world, and NFL Europe, a developmental league based in Europe. The American Bowls ended in 2005 (though a similar China Bowl was planned for 2007 before being canceled), while NFL Europa (as it was known for its final season) folded in 2007. On October 2, 2005, the Arizona Cardinals defeated the San Francisco 49ers by a score of 31–14 at Estadio Azteca in Mexico City, Mexico, under the name "NFL Fútbol Americano". It was the first regular season NFL game held outside the United States. The game drew the NFL's highest game attendance at the time with 103,467 spectators.

Roger Goodell, the commissioner of the National Football League, considered expanding the league's appeal overseas ever since the end of NFL Europa. Goodell has openly discussed the idea of holding a future Super Bowl game in London. The NFL also investigated the possibility of adding a 17th regular season game to all teams, taking the place of the fourth pre-season game. Waller notes that there will not be 16 different venues for the 17th games. More likely would be a "mini-season ticket" of perhaps four games in one city or country. There was discussion that this "17th game" could take effect as early as the 2009 NFL season; however, 2010 would be the earliest this could be implemented because of concerns about playing on Labor Day or over the 2010 Winter Olympics, the league's rigid scheduling formula, and the league's collective bargaining agreement (CBA). League officials were pondering moving a second existing game abroad for the 2010 season, but eventually abandoned it due to the ongoing CBA negotiations. The league eventually abandoned its attempt to expand the NFL season via CBA negotiations, and the new CBA enacted in 2011 kept the NFL schedule at 16 games through 2020. However, the CBA enacted in 2021 expanded the regular season to 17 games with one bye week and introduced at least four neutral site games each year from 2022. Teams will alternate seasons where they host nine regular-season games and one preseason game, or eight regular-season games and two preseason games. The NFC will have nine regular season home games in the 2022 season.

Games in the United Kingdom are broadcast by Sky Sports and the BBC with highlights also shown by the BBC. On radio, the games are broadcast by BBC Radio 5 Live Sports Extra, with Arlo White commentating, and Talksport with Nat Coombs commentating.

The games have been popular, with tickets selling out in two days, nine months in advance. According to the NFL, only 3% of those attending the London games are Americans or American expatriates, while 22% are from London and 60% from elsewhere in Britain. Ticket prices start from £64 at Tottenham Hotspur Stadium and £44 at Wembley Stadium. A team that plays a home game in London sells a cheaper season ticket package for its own stadium with seven regular season games rather than the usual eight. Each designated home team receives US$1 million for giving up the home game.

On October 11, 2011, the NFL owners approved playing NFL games in Great Britain through 2016. This stated that a home team could visit every year for up to five years but visitors could only visit once every five years. However, in 2015 the Detroit Lions returned to London as visitors in an apparent disregard for this rule. Subsequently, an agreement was reached to play internationally through 2025.

The Buffalo Bills received a unanimous vote of approval to play a series of regular and preseason games at Rogers Centre in Toronto from 2008 to 2017. This was separate from the regular International Series as arrangements are made by the team as opposed to the league as with the International Series. The Bills' Toronto Series was mutually terminated after the 2013 contest.

Due to significant time zone differences, from 2007 to 2015 teams playing in London would have their bye week in the following week after their game in London. For 2016, the Indianapolis Colts volunteered to play a game the week after their London game, preferring to have their bye week later in the season. The Colts playing the week after London was also done by the NFL as a test to see team fatigue for evaluation of an eventual London franchise. As Mexico City is within the Central Time Zone—eight NFL teams play home games in Central Time and the rest are within two hours of it—no bye week would be needed for those teams, though they may still by chance be scheduled their regular bye week anyway. For 2017, three teams playing in London (the Baltimore Ravens, Jacksonville Jaguars and Miami Dolphins), would have games immediately following their International Series game. In all three cases, the teams playing after their International Series game are based on the East Coast of the United States and will either be home or (in the Jaguars' case) playing in East Rutherford, New Jersey. In 2018 and 2019 all teams once again received their bye immediately following their international game, including the teams who played in Mexico.

Through 2020, due to NFL rules, teams that were playing in temporary homes as part of a relocation or that were recently awarded the hosting of the Super Bowl were required to play a home game internationally. The Los Angeles Rams, upon relocating from St. Louis, agreed to host an international game from 2016 to 2019, while their new stadium was being built. The Los Angeles Chargers, who would share the stadium with the Rams, also hosted an international game in 2018 and 2019, only getting out of the 2017 game because the team had executed its get out clause to relocate from San Diego after the 2017 International Series games had been announced. The Oakland Raiders, who spent the 2019 off-season in limbo due to the expiration of their stadium deal in Oakland and the lack of an NFL-ready stadium in their eventual home in Las Vegas, also agreed to annual international home games through 2019.

NFL rules require the designated home team for each international game to have their home stadium reserved for use in the event that a game cannot be played at the international site.

History

Early years (2007–2012)

The Miami Dolphins hosted the New York Giants in the first International Series game at Wembley Stadium in London, England, on October 28, 2007. The Giants defeated the Dolphins 13–10 in the first regular season NFL game held outside North America. The first 40,000 tickets sold out for the game in the first 90 minutes of sales. The game was aired regionally on Fox.

A single game was held in London each year through 2011. Like the 2007 game, each was televised nationally in the United Kingdom, but only regionally in the United States.

Multi-year deals and multi-game years (2013–2015)

On January 20, 2012, NFL commissioner Roger Goodell confirmed that from 2012 to 2014, the St. Louis Rams would play one of their eight home games each year at Wembley Stadium. However, on August 13, 2012, the team announced that they would not play the proposed games in London in 2013 and 2014, only the 2012 game against the New England Patriots that had already been scheduled. Goodell had previously proposed the use of certain regular teams in the International Series in an effort to build a fan base for those teams, raising the prospect of a permanent NFL team on the British Isles.

An NFL bid to become anchor tenants of London's Olympic Stadium failed.

The Jacksonville Jaguars took the Rams' place and agreed to play a home game in London for four seasons from 2013 through 2016. With this announcement also came news that the NFL were working to schedule a second UK game from 2013 onwards (the Jaguars later extended their agreement with Wembley Stadium through 2020 in an agreement announced in October 2015). In October 2012, it was announced that the Jaguars would host the San Francisco 49ers and the Minnesota Vikings would host the Pittsburgh Steelers, marking the first season with multiple games in London.

The NFL played three international games for the 2014 season, including one game with an earlier 9:30 am ET (2:30 pm UK time) start, which allowed for an afternoon game, rather than an evening game, in London. This timeslot proved to be successful as all London games in 2015 and 2016 were also scheduled at 9:30 am ET. Three games were again scheduled in 2015 – including the series' first division game between the New York Jets and the Miami Dolphins.

Long-term deals and new stadiums (2016–2021)

On July 8, 2015, the NFL and Tottenham Hotspur F.C. announced they had reached a 10-year deal to host at least two London Games a year at the new Tottenham Hotspur Stadium from its opening year in 2019. Additionally, on October 7, 2015, the league announced that a resolution had been passed to schedule international games at additional locations to London until 2025. Subsequently, on October 22, 2015, it was confirmed that at least two games per season would remain at Wembley through at least 2020 and that the Jacksonville Jaguars will continue to play a home game there annually throughout the agreement. Another stadium deal was confirmed on November 3, 2015, when the league announced they had reached an agreement with England's Rugby Football Union to host regular season games at Twickenham Stadium from 2016 onwards, with a minimum of three, and as many as five games to be held over the initial agreement period of three years.

In 2016, the Oakland Raiders hosted the Houston Texans on November 21 at Estadio Azteca in Mexico City, at the first International Series game played in Mexico. Previously, the Houston Texans and Pittsburgh Steelers had expressed interest in playing a game at Estadio Azteca (or possibly Estadio Olímpico Universitario) in Mexico City, although Houston was not prepared to give up a home date. It was televised as part of ESPN's Monday Night Football, marking the first MNF game broadcast from outside the United States, and ESPN's second broadcast from Mexico City since the 2005 Fútbol Americano game (which was televised as part of ESPN's former incarnation of Sunday Night Football).

The 2016 game between the Redskins and Bengals was the first International Series game to go into overtime, the first to end as a tie, and had at the time the highest attendance of all International Series games (later surpassed by the 2017 game between the Ravens and Jaguars, which drew an attendance of 84,592).

For 2017 the series underwent a partial rebrand with four games in London branded as NFL London Games and one game in Mexico City branded as the NFL Mexico Game.

In January 2018, it was announced that three games would be played in London that year, with two at Wembley and the other the first game at Tottenham Hotspur's new stadium. However, it was later confirmed that the opening of Tottenham Hotspur Stadium would be delayed and therefore all three games would be held at Wembley. Having already fulfilled the minimum three-game requirement for Twickenham Stadium in 2017, the league would no longer host games there. The Mexico City date and opponents were not announced at that time, but were later confirmed as the Los Angeles Rams playing as designated home team against the Kansas City Chiefs. This game was subsequently moved to Los Angeles due to poor field conditions at Estadio Azteca. The ensuing game would also attract notoriety as the third-highest scoring game in NFL history, and the highest-scoring game in Monday Night Football history.

In October 2018, the league confirmed four London Games would take place in 2019. Wembley Stadium would host two and Tottenham Hotspur Stadium would host the remaining two. The Jacksonville Jaguars would return to Wembley Stadium for the seventh consecutive year in line with their annual commitment. The final schedule was announced in April 2019 alongside that of the rest of the regular season. This marked the end of the Los Angeles Chargers', Los Angeles Rams' and Oakland Raiders' annual commitments, with all three moving to new stadiums in 2020.

In November 2019, the Atlanta Falcons and Miami Dolphins were announced as home teams for 2020 games in either London or Mexico City.

On February 4, 2020, it was announced that the Jaguars would play two home games at Wembley Stadium on consecutive weekends in 2020, the first time a team had done so. 2020 would also have been the final year of games at Wembley Stadium and the final year of the Jaguars' agreement to host annual home games there. On February 28, 2020, it was announced that the Arizona Cardinals would host a game in Mexico City. Their hosting was due to the awarding of Super Bowl LVII to the State Farm Stadium in 2018. The Cardinals would have returned to Estadio Azteca for the first time since 2005's Fútbol Americano game. The date and opponent were not announced at the time. On May 4, 2020, the league announced that all international games for  have been moved back to the home stadiums of the designated home teams due to the COVID-19 pandemic.

On April 1, 2021, the Atlanta Falcons announced their intention to play a home game at Tottenham Hotspur Stadium in October 2021. On May 11, it was reported that the Falcons and Jaguars would each host a game at Tottenham Hotspur Stadium. This was confirmed the following day. This would mark the Jaguars' eighth home game in London but their first at Tottenham.

International marketing and expansion (2022–present)

The National Football League announced the International Home Marketing Areas initiative, where 18 NFL teams have been selected to freely market their team across eight countries, starting in January 2022. In May 2022, two more countries were added to the list of international marketing. Teams were selected based on their proposals submitted to the NFL, along with the performance of their marketing domestically. The following teams were granted the five-year initiative that will allow marketing methods such as in-person events, sponsorships, and merchandise sales, as well as a high priority to compete in the countries granted in:

Notes

On February 9, 2022, the NFL confirmed the addition of the Germany Games to the International Series slate, initially with one game each year from 2022 to 2025. Mark Waller had previously stated in 2017 that the only holdup with games in Germany was what he dubbed "an inventory management thing," in that with four games already being played in London each year, adding additional games in Germany atop those four would pose logistical problems. The addition of a 17th game to the schedule in 2020 has the potential to provide up to 16 neutral site games to be held in venues that do not host NFL teams, including outside the United States. The league began gauging interest from German cities regarding potential games in June 2021; the league viewed Germany as an ideal candidate for expansion of the International Series because of the country's high viewership for NFL games (2.2 million people in Germany watched Super Bowl LV) and the country's numerous modern stadiums. In October 2021, it was confirmed that Düsseldorf, Frankfurt and Munich had been invited to participate in deeper conversations about hosting NFL games.

In March 2022, the Jaguars confirmed they had reached an agreement with Wembley Stadium to host an annual game through 2024.

Game history

London Games

Mexico Games

Germany Games

Notes

Standings

Future

Future markets
Within the United Kingdom, aside from London, potential candidates for hosting NFL games include the Millennium Stadium in Cardiff, Wales; and Murrayfield Stadium in Edinburgh, Scotland. Other prime locations to get games would be Croke Park in Dublin, Ireland (Ireland has already hosted the NCAA Emerald Isle Classic, a college football game similar to the International Series, and former Steelers owner Dan Rooney was once an ambassador to the country), Maracanã Stadium in Rio de Janeiro, Brazil; China, Brazil, Australia and Canada (Canada hosted the Bills Toronto Series from 2008 to 2013 and a preseason game between the Green Bay Packers and the Oakland Raiders at IG Field in Winnipeg, Manitoba in 2019). In 2007, NFL senior Vice President Mark Waller doubted Asia or Australia would be targeted because of travel concerns, but did not dismiss the possibility. The league had planned to host a game in China in 2018 with the Los Angeles Rams as the home team against the San Francisco 49ers. The potential game in China was postponed (the third time the league has postponed playing in China, following failed attempts in 2007 and 2009) to being aimed for the 2019 season to coincide with the league's 100th anniversary; that game ultimately was not scheduled for 2019. The league has indicated that a China game is still not certain because of the lack of a fan base in the country; NFL games are played in the middle of the night in China. Other potential problems include whether the stadiums in China are suitable to play an NFL game and Beijing's notoriously poor air quality. The topic of a 2020 preseason game in China was discussed in the 2019 owners' meetings, but no news came out of those meetings.

Potential London team

The success of the International Series has led the NFL to focus its global expansion aims on the possibility of having a full franchise located in London. It is believed this would be most likely achieved through relocation of an existing franchise, with the Jaguars most often linked due to their association with the International Series, even though their owner is said to be content with the current arrangement and other franchises have more reason to move (the most often cited being poor on-field performance, lack of fans and uncertainty over stadium leases). The NFL has used some of the specific arrangements for the International Series games as a test bed for predicting how a London franchise could be made effective from a logistical and competitiveness standpoint.

Prior to the start of the 2019 season, the "extreme long shot" possibility arose that the Oakland Raiders, due to legal disputes with the city of Oakland and Alameda County, could play all of their home games in London in 2019; they were already slated to host one regular season game abroad and also played one of their preseason games in Winnipeg. Cost and logistics concerns left this scenario unlikely and was rendered moot when the Raiders and city and county officials ultimately reached an agreement to allow the Raiders to remain at the Oakland Coliseum through the 2019 season, before moving to Las Vegas in 2020.

See also
 List of National Football League games played outside the United States
 American Bowl
 Canadian Football League in the United States

References
Explanatory notes

Citations

External links

American football in England
American football in London
American football in Mexico
American football in Germany
International Series